General elections were held in Niue on 18 March 1972. Only five of the eleven constituencies were contested, with the candidates in the other six constituencies elected unopposed.

Aftermath
Following the elections, Robert Rex was re-elected as Leader of Government Business and formed an Executive Council of four members.

Shortly after the elections concluded, a Select Committee for Constitutional Development was established to look at issues including land laws and the future relationship with New Zealand. This led to a referendum on self-governance in 1974.

References

Niue
Elections in Niue
1972 in Niue
March 1972 events in Oceania